London Lions may refer to:

London Lions (basketball), an English basketball team
London Lions (ice hockey), a defunct English ice hockey team
London Lions (speedway), an English motorcycle speedway team
London Lions F.C., an English association football team
North London Lions, an Australian football team